Miss World 1990, the 40th anniversary of the Miss World pageant, was held on 8 November 1990 at the London Palladium in London, United Kingdom. The winner was Gina Tolleson representing United States. She was crowned by Miss World 1989, Aneta Beata Kreglicka of Poland. After this event, the Miss World competition began to be held outside the United Kingdom, such as in Atlanta, Hong Kong and Sun City, South Africa..This is the second time that United States to win Miss World.

Results

Placements

Continental Queens of Beauty

Contestants

Judges

 Eric Morley † 
 Krish Naidoo † 
 Josie Fonseca
 Michael Ward
 Kimberley Santos – Miss World 1980 from Guam
 Wilnelia Merced – Miss World 1975 from Puerto Rico
 Ralph Halpern † 
 Rob Brandt
 Knut Meiner
 Ruth Moxnes
 Thomas Ledin
 Terje Aass
 Ann-Mari Albertsen
 Jarle Johansen
 Ingeborg Sorensen

Notes

Debuts
  competed in Miss World for the first time after the Miss World Organization allowed the nation to compete after a 24-year revolution.

Returns

Last competed in 1974:
 
Last competed in 1987:
 
Last competed in 1988:

Withdrawals

  – Due to lack of sponsorship
  – Due to a civil war
  – Due to lack of sponsorship

References

External links
 Pageantopolis – Miss World 1990

Miss World
1990 in London
1990 beauty pageants
Beauty pageants in the United Kingdom
November 1990 events in the United Kingdom